Resorption is the absorption of cells or tissue into the circulatory system, usually by osteoclasts.

Types of resorption include:
 Bone resorption
 Herniated Disc Resorption
 Tooth resorption
 Fetal resorption
 Blood resorption

See also 

 Nutrient resorption, in plants

References

Set index articles